Baltimore Water Taxi is a water taxi service offering sightseeing and transportation service mainly to points along the Baltimore Inner Harbor.

History
The Baltimore Water Taxi (BWT) was founded by Edward M. Kane (1931–2003), and for many years known as Ed Kane's Water Taxi.  In 2010 it was sold and renamed.

While tourism is the traditional use of these taxis, there are increasing efforts to use them as commuter transportation.  Here one of the barriers is getting from the dock to the office, and Ed Kane's was one of the first to offer extra ground transportation for this purpose.  The city of Baltimore is encouraging this by subsidizing some new routes, some operated by Ed Kane's, but this has in turn been criticized as an inefficient use of taxpayer money.

In 2016, the Baltimore Water Taxi service was purchased by Sagamore Ventures, operated by Harbor Boating, Inc. Under the new ownership, the Baltimore Water Taxi has plans to expand transportation service to Port Covington in South Baltimore.

Routes
The BWT has five taxi routes and one Harbor Connector route that circulate the Patapsco River from Memorial Day to Labor Day.
Red: Two-stop route from Harborplace to Fell's Point.
Green: Circulates counterclockwise from Harbor East to Rusty Scupper (stopping at piers 1-5 & 7).
Yellow: Circulates counterclockwise from Fell's Point to Tide Point (stopping at piers 4, 7, 8, 10 & 11).
Purple: Two-stop route from Fell's Point to Fort McHenry.
Blue: Circulates counterclockwise from Captain James Landing to Canton Waterfront Park (stopping at piers 10, 11, 14, & 16)
Harbor Connector: Connects Maritime Park to Tide Point and Canton Waterfront Park. Runs Monday thru Friday 7:00 AM to 7:00 PM.

Stops
, the system has five taxi lines with seventeen stops throughout the Inner Harbor.

See also
Living Classrooms Foundation, was a competitor operating the Harbor Shuttle service in Baltimore's Harbor until closing after an accident in March 2004.

References

 bizjournals
Discover Baltimore
Waterfront Tech
Baltimore Harbor: A Pictorial History
Atlanta Business Chronicle

External links
Company Home Page
Baltimore Sun article on water taxi status after a competitors taxi capsized

Fell's Point, Baltimore
Inner Harbor, Baltimore
Water transportation in Maryland
Transportation in Baltimore
Water taxis